(born 14 May 1982) is a Japanese actress, model, and television personality. One of the first popular teen models / idols known in Japan as "Chaidoru" (a word play on child and idol), she has appeared in numerous TV dramas, commercials, and films.

Early life

Born in Tokyo and raised in both Tokyo and Chiba, Yoshino as a child wondered how children appeared on TV programs, until she learnt that to be cast she would need to a talent agency / agent. Without her parents foreknowledge, she sent out applications (including a school yearbook photograph of herself) to agencies advertised in newspapers until one responded with a request to meet and interview in person. As a young girl not able to travel to the meeting alone, Yoshino informed her mother and was escorted to the agency interview of which she was later offered to join.

Career
Yoshino began her career in 1994 after being selected in a public audition by a talent agency that she applied herself. After gaining popularity as a model appearing in fashion magazines, winning reader polled contests, and being cast in spoken roles for television commercials, she was cast in the first feature film Maborosi by film director Koreeda Hirokazu. 
At about the same time she began appearing as a guest actress on television drama's and started to take on more extended roles in other feature films. Yoshino was cast in character designer and director Keita Amemiya's fantasy - action film, Moon Over Tao and again in Koreeda's second feature film, After Life, of which garnered critical acclaim both in Japan and abroad. 
Yoshino's growing popularity defined a new phenomenon, as a young multi-faceted idol, which the media coined "Chaidol" (combining the words "child" and "idol").

Personal life
Yoshino is known as an avid dog lover and animal rights advocate. She has participated in charity events promoting social awareness of dog shelters and independently promoted animal rights through her webcast show "Hello From Earth" focusing on dog shelters seeking to find foster families. Yoshino has also used her webcast show to focus on Fair Trade and has participated in public Fair Trade events. She has also shared that she is currently developing her own ethical / sustainable fashion brand.

Since Yoshino had not finished her high school studies due to difficulty juggling her commitments as an actress / TV personality and a student, she later worked to complete the requirements to receive the Certificate for Students Achieving the Proficiency Level of Upper Secondary School Graduates (similar to the GED in the United States). Throughout her studies, she publicly shared her progress and personal feelings on the subject on her internet blog, and successfully received the certificate of completion of Upper Secondary School Graduates (High School) and made news headlines.

In 2012, it was announced that Yoshino had married her partner / boyfriend (a U.S. citizen) in 2010.

In April 2017, it was announced Yoshino held a wedding ceremony after having registered her union with her husband 7 years before. Images of her as a bride and a message of gratitude was made public.

On 20 March 2021, she announced on her blog that she gave birth to their first child, a baby boy on 15 February.

Filmography

Film

Television

Video Games & Animation

Theatre

References

External links
 

1982 births
Living people
Actresses from Tokyo
20th-century Japanese actresses
21st-century Japanese actresses
Japanese film actresses
Japanese stage actresses
Japanese television actresses